Botoșanița may refer to one of two villages in Suceava County, Romania:

Botoșanița Mare, a village in Calafindești Commune
Botoșanița Mică, a village in Grămești Commune

See also 
 Botoșana River
 Botoșani, name of a city and a county in Romania